Bonne or Bonné can refer to:

People
 Given name
 Bonne of Armagnac (1399 – 1430/35), eldest daughter of Bernard VII, Count of Armagnac and of Bonne of Berry
 Bonne of Artois, (1396-1425), daughter of Philip of Artois, Count of Eu and of Marie, Duchess of Auvergne.
 Bonne of Berry (1362/1365 – 1435), daughter of John, Duke of Berry and of Joanna of Armagnac
 Bonne of Bohemia (AKA Jutta of Luxemburg, 1315–1349), first wife of King John II of France
 Psalter of Bonne de Luxembourg, probably executed for Bonne of Bohemia
 Bonne of Bourbon (1341-1402), daughter of Peter I, Duke of Bourbon and of Isabella of Valois, who acted as regent of Savoy
 Bonne Marie Félicité de Montmorency-Luxembourg (1739-1823), French courtier, Duchesse de Serent
 Bonne de Pons d'Heudicourt (1641-1709), royal mistress of Louis XIV of France
 Yasnyiar Bonne Gea (born 1982), Indonesian female professional surfer

 Surname
 Daisurami Bonne (born 1988), Cuban track and field sprint athlete who specialises in the 400 metres
 Félix Bonne (born ), Cuban engineering professor and dissident
 François de Bonne, Duke of Lesdiguières (1543-1626), soldier of the French Wars of Religion and Constable of France
 Idalmis Bonne (born 1971), Cuban sprinter
 Jon Bonné (born 1972), American wine writer,
 Macauley Bonne (born 1995), English professional footballer
 Mirko Bonné (born 1965), German writer and translator
 Pierre-Amable de Bonne (1758-1816), seigneur, lawyer, judge and political figure in Lower Canada
 Rémy Bonne (born 1989), French professional footballer 
 Rigobert Bonne (1727–1795), French cartographer
 Shirley Bonne (born 1934), American television actress
 Yowlys Bonne (born 1983), Cuban freestyle wrestler who competed at the 2012 Summer Olympics

Places
 Bonne, Haute-Savoie, a commune in the Haute-Savoie department and Rhône-Alpes region of eastern France
 Bonne Bay, a bay in Newfoundland, Canada
 Bonne Bay Marine Station, a marine ecology research and teaching facility on Bonne Bay
 Bonne Glacier, Antarctica
 Bonne Nouvelle (Paris Métro), a metro station

Other uses
 Bonne Bell, a U.S. cosmetics company
 Bonne projection, a pseudoconical equal-area map projection
 Bonne Maman, French food company
 La Bonne (AKA Corruption), a 1986 erotic film directed by Salvatore Samperi

See also 
 Bon (disambiguation)
 Bonnes (disambiguation)
 Bonnie (disambiguation)
 Bonne Aventure, a village in the county of Victoria, Trinidad
 Bonne Bouche, an aged goat's milk cheese made by Vermont Creamery, of Websterville, Vermont, since 2001
 Bonne Citoyenne-class corvette, French warships built 1794-1796
 HMS Bonne Citoyenne (1796), a 20-gun corvette originally of the French Navy
 Bonne-Espérance (disambiguation)
 Bonne Femme (disambiguation)
 Bonne Fin, a village in the Cavaellon commune in the Aquin Arrondissement, in the Sud Department of Haiti
 Bonne Maison Aerodrome, a temporary World War I airfield in France
 Bonne nouvelle (disambiguation)
 "Bonne nuit ma chérie", the German entry in the 1960 Eurovision Song Contest
 Bonne Terre, Missouri, a city in St. Francois County, Missouri, United States
 Guillaume de Bonne-Carrere (1754-1825), French diplomat,
 Jacques Bonne-Gigault de Bellefonds (1698–1746), Archbishop of Arles 1741-1746
 La bonne année (Happy New Year), a 1973 film directed by Claude Lelouch
 La Bonne Aventure, a French-Canadian soap opera TV series 1982-1986
 La Bonne Chanson (disambiguation)
 La bonne d'enfant (The Nanny), an 1856 opérette bouffe in one act by Jacques Offenbach
 "La bonne du curé" ("The Priest's Maid"), a 1974 song by Belgian singer Annie Cordy
 The Misadventures of Tron Bonne, an action-adventure PlayStation video game released in 1999